The Twelfth East Asia Summit was held in Pasay, Philippines on November 13–14, 2017. The East Asia Summit is an annual meeting of national leaders from the East Asian region and adjoining countries.

Attending delegations
The heads of state and heads of government of the eighteen countries participated in the summit. A total of 14 of the 21 attendees had attended the 2017 APEC Economic Leaders' Meeting in Đà Nẵng, Vietnam just two days prior (November 11), including the host of the summit, Philippine President Rodrigo Duterte. Meanwhile, all of the attendees, except for one, had attended the related 31st ASEAN Summit in the same venue the day prior. 

U.S. President Donald Trump initially planned to attend the summit, having already entered the venue, the Philippine International Convention Center, but left before the group photo due to a two-hour delay. Secretary of State Rex Tillerson attended in President Trump's place.

Gallery

Guest invitees

References

2017 conferences
2017 in international relations
21st-century diplomatic conferences (Asia-Pacific)
ASEAN meetings
November 2017 events in the Philippines